Wes Edwards is a music video and commercial director. He has directed over 150 official music videos in various genres from country to EDM. He has created multiple videos for Brothers Osborne, Dierks Bentley, Dash Berlin, and Emma Hewitt. In 2020 he co-founded production company Strange Arcade. In 2022 he directed the documentary series American Anthems with Academy and Emmy award winning Believe Entertainment Group for PBS.

Edwards has won two CMA Video Of The Year awards for videos he directed. He has won Three ACM awards for Video Of The Year, two as a director and one as a producer. In addition, he has won an award for CMT Video Of The Year and a GMA Dove Award for Video Of The Year.

He had two videos in Billboard Magazine's Top 100 Music Videos of the Decade (all genre) 2010-2020.

Music videos directed

Awards

References

External links
Official website

American music video directors
Living people
Year of birth missing (living people)